F1 is a racing video game series by Codemasters under the EA Sports banner since 2021. The series holds the official license of the FIA Formula One World Championship, with the FIA Formula 2 Championship available since the 2019 game. A total of twenty-one games have been released to date, with the series' latest installment, F1 22, released in July 2022.

Release history
Electronic Arts' EA Sports division started the series with F1 2000. Six games have been released between 2000 and 2003, when Image Space Incorporated and Visual Science took charge of the PC and the console versions respectively. Intelligent Games also involved to produce F1 Manager for Microsoft Windows in 2000.

In May 2008, Codemasters acquired the license after the end of Sony's own Formula One video game series, developing by Ego engine. They release each game in the series at an annual pace, one game per season, with the first game being available on Wii, PlayStation Portable and iOS in 2009. Feral Interactive and Sumo Digital were once responsible for platform transplantation. Subsequent sequels were released on contemporary Sony and Microsoft consoles and computers. Following the acquisition of Electronic Arts in 2021, F1 2019 and F1 2020 were available on EA Play, among with the Dirt series, the Grid series and the Project CARS series.

Since EA acquired Codemasters in 2021, EA has recovered rights for the F1 title again, with EA Sports returning to publish the series' new installment, F1 2021. The game was released in July 2021 and was the first game in the series available for the ninth generation of video game consoles.

Games

EA Sports' out-house era (2000–2003)

F1 2000 (2000)

The first video game of the series was developed by Visual Science for the PlayStation and Image Space Incorporated for Microsoft Windows. The game was initially available on 29 February 2000.

F1 Championship Season 2000 (2000)

A second video game based on the 2000 Formula One World Championship was initially released by EA Sports for PlayStation, Microsoft Windows, PlayStation 2 and Game Boy Color on 28 September 2000.

F1 Manager (2000)

A spin-off game developed by Intelligent Games was available for Microsoft Windows on 6 October 2000. The game features ten-year managing simulation within a Formula One team.

F1 2001 (2001)

F1 2001 holds the official license of the 2001 Formula One World Championship. It was released for Microsoft Windows, PlayStation 2 and Xbox platforms.

F1 2002 (2002)

A fifth game of the series, titled F1 2002, was released for Xbox, Microsoft Windows, PlayStation 2, GameCube and Game Boy Advance.

F1 Career Challenge (2003)

The last video game in the series developed by Visual Science, titled as F1 Career Challenge or F1 Challenge '99–'02, was available for GameCube, Microsoft Windows, PlayStation 2, Xbox in June 2003.

Codemasters' independent era (2009–2020)

F1 2009 (2009)

F1 2009, the first video game by Codemasters, was announced in May 2008 after Codemasters secured the official Formula One video game licence. The game was developed by Sumo Digital and based on the 2009 Formula One World Championship season. It was initially released on 16 November 2009 and available for Wii and PlayStation Portable platforms.

F1 2010 (2010)

F1 2010 was based on the 2010 season of the Formula One World Championship. The game was released to three new platforms, Microsoft Windows, PlayStation 3 and Xbox 360 on 22 September 2010.

F1 2011 (2011)

Based on the 2011 Formula One World Championship, F1 2011 was initially released on 20 September 2011 as the third game of the franchise. In addition to the platforms on which F1 2010 launched, the game was also available on Nintendo 3DS and PlayStation Vita.

F1 2012 (2012)

A fourth game by Codemasters that titled in the F1 series was announced on 18 March 2012, coinciding with the first race of the 2012 season. It was available on Microsoft Windows, PlayStation 3 and Xbox 360 on 21 September 2012. A Mac OS X version ported by Feral Interactive was released on 20 December 2012.

F1 Race Stars (2012)

A spin-off kart racing game, titled F1 Race Stars, was initially released on 13 November 2012. It was loosely based on the 2012 Formula One World Championship, featuring loops, jumps and short-cuts in several redesigned Formula One circuits. The game was ported to the Wii U platform under the title F1 Race Stars: Powered Up Edition, where it was released on 16 January 2014.

F1 2013 (2013)

F1 2013 is the sixth video game by Codemasters based on the Formula One World Championship that was developed by Codemasters. It was initially released on 4 October 2013 on Microsoft Windows, PlayStation 3 and Xbox 360, with a Mac OS X version by Feral Interactive to follow in early 2014.

F1 2014 (2014)

F1 2014 features new hybrid-powered cars introduced in the 2014 season. It was the last game in the series released for seventh generation of video game consoles Xbox 360 and PlayStation 3.

F1 2015 (2015)

F1 2015 is the first game of the franchise that was available for the eighth generation of video game consoles PlayStation 4 and Xbox One. It was released on 10 July 2015 and based on the 2015 Formula One World Championship, with the 2014 season as bonus content.

F1 2016 (2016)

The ninth video game by Codemasters that carries on the Formula One title was released on 19 August 2016 on Microsoft Windows, PlayStation 4 and Xbox One. It featured all drivers and teams of the 2016 Formula One World Championship. The game received four more platforms, macOS, iOS, Android and tvOS.

F1 2017 (2017)

F1 2017 is the tenth video game of the series by Codemasters and is based on the 2017 Formula One World Championship. It was released for Microsoft Windows, PlayStation 4 and Xbox One on 25 August 2017. Following the foundation of the Formula One eSports Series, the game was used in its debut season. The game also features several classic cars. They also edited short circuits in the game.

F1 2018 (2018)

F1 2018 is the sixteenth official video game of the FIA Formula One World Championship, and the eleventh of the franchise by Codemasters. It was available for Microsoft Windows, PlayStation 4 and Xbox One on 24 August 2018. In addition to the cars that were competed in the 2018 Formula One World Championship, the game also includes various classic Formula One cars.

F1 2019 (2019)

In addition to the 2019 Formula One World Championship, F1 2019 also holds the official licence of the 2019 FIA Formula 2 Championship, with the 2018 season available from launch. Like its predecessor F1 2018, the game also contains a number of classic cars. The game also features a DLC that focused on the Prost–Senna rivalry.

F1 2020 (2020)

F1 2020 is the official video game of the 2020 Formula 1 and Formula 2 Championships (2019 season from launch with 2020 season being added in an update). The game allows players to create their own team, as well as following its trend of adding extra classic cars to the series. It features the championship as it had originally been intended to be run. The game was released on 10 July 2020 for Microsoft Windows, PlayStation 4, Xbox One and Stadia.

EA's return (2021–present)

F1 2021 (2021)

Codemasters announced F1 2021 on 15 April 2021 as the official game of the 2021 Formula One and Formula 2 Championships. The game features a story mode and new circuits including Imola, Portimão and the calendar newcomer Jeddah. However, classic cars have been removed from this iteration of the game. It was released for Microsoft Windows, PlayStation 4, PlayStation 5, Xbox One and Xbox Series X/S on 16 July 2021, with EA Sports publishing the game for the first time since F1 Career Challenge in 2003.

F1 22 (2022)

F1 22 was announced on 21 April 2022 as the official game of the 2022 Formula One and Formula 2 championships. The game features a series of track updates and new car models following the introduction of the new regulation. The game was released on 1 July 2022 for Microsoft Windows, PlayStation 4, PlayStation 5, Xbox One and Xbox Series X/S.

F1 23 (2023)
F1 23 was teased on 1 March 2023 as a "fresh start" for the series.

Notes

References

External links

 

 
Electronic Arts franchises
Racing video games
Video game franchises introduced in 2000